Agathia arcuata is a species of moth of the family Geometridae first described by Frederic Moore in 1868. It is found in India, Burma, Hainan, Peninsular Malaysia, Borneo, Sumatra and Java.

External links

Geometrinae
Moths of Asia